Limestone Creek is a tributary of the Tennessee River in Tennessee and Alabama.

Limestone Creek may also refer to:

Streams
(alphabetical by state)
 Limestone Creek (Chattahoochee River tributary), in Georgia
 Limestone Creek (Ocmulgee River tributary), a tributary of the Ocmulgee River in Georgia
 Limestone Creek (Kansas), a tributary of the Little Osage River in Bourbon and Allen counties
 Limestone Creek (Solomon River tributary), in Kansas
 Limestone Creek (Miami Creek tributary), in Missouri
 Limestone Creek (Turnback Creek tributary), in Missouri
 Limestone Creek (Cowaselon Creek), site of Buttermilk Falls in Madison County, New York
 Limestone Creek (Chittenango Creek tributary), in New York

Settlements
 Limestone Creek, Florida, a census-designated place in Palm Beach County